The 2019 South Sydney Rabbitohs season was the 110th in the club's history. Coached by Wayne Bennett and captained by Sam Burgess, they compete in the National Rugby League's 2019 Telstra Premiership.

Harold Matthews Cup

Regular season

Finals

S.G. Ball Cup

Regular season

Jersey Flegg Cup

Regular season

Finals

NSW Women's Premiership

Regular season

Canterbury Cup

Regular season

Finals

Squad Movements

Players

2019 Gains

2019 Losses

Re-Signs

Coaches

Pre-Season

Regular season 
Home games in bold

Finals

Representative Honor's 

 Bold denotes players who captained their respective teams.
(SoT) - Train on Squad

References 

South Sydney Rabbitohs seasons
South Sydney Rabbitohs season